Abondio is a surname. Notable people with the surname include:

 Antonio Abondio (1538–1591), Italian sculptor
 Josette Abondio (born 1949), Ivorian teacher, writer, and playwright

See also
 Abbondio, given name
 Abundio, given name